Yongdamjeong (lit. Dragon Pool Pavilion) is a sacred place to Cheondoism, located on Mt. Gumi in Gajeong-ri, Hyeongok-myeon, Gyeongju, South Korea.

Religious significance
Cheondoism is an indigenous Korean religion that evolved from Donghak (Eastern learning). Choe Je-u, the founder of Donghak, was born and later buried at Yongdamjeong. There is a statue in his image near the pavilion.

See also
Donghak
Choe Je-u

References

Hanok
Gyeongju
Religion in Korea
Joseon dynasty